The 2020–21 Florida Atlantic Owls women's basketball team represented Florida Atlantic University during the 2020–21 NCAA Division I women's basketball season. The team was led by fifth-year head coach Jim Jabir, and played their home games at the FAU Arena in Boca Raton, Florida as a member of Conference USA.

Schedule and results

|-
!colspan=12 style=|Non-conference regular season

|-
!colspan=12 style=|CUSA regular season

|-
!colspan=12 style=| CUSA Tournament

See also
 2020–21 Florida Atlantic Owls men's basketball team

Notes

References

Florida Atlantic Owls women's basketball seasons
Florida Atlantic
Florida Atlantic Owls women's basketball team
Florida Atlantic Owls women's basketball team